Ali Samadi Ahadi (born 9 February 1972 in Tabriz, Iran)  is an Iranian-German filmmaker and scriptwriter who has directed Lost Children, Salami Aleikum, The Green Wave, etc.

Biography 
Ali Samadi Ahadi was born in 1972 in Tabriz, Iran. He is an Iranian Azerbaijani. During Iran-Iraq War, at the age of 12 he escaped alone from home to avoid being killed in the war. He took his Abitur in Hannover and studied sociology and electronic media in Hannover. He has been working as an independent scriptwriter, director and editor. His documentary Africa Mayibuye had its premiere at the Filmfestival of Mannheim. His music documentary film Culture Clan was nominated for the Rose d'Or 2005 at the Montreux film festival.

Ali was diagnosed with leukemia in 2015 in Germany. He received the diagnosis after seeking care for "stomach pain" the same year.

Filmography 

 1992: Leipziger Allerlei, Short film (together with Nils Loof and Rasmus Sievers)
 1996: Geburtstag mit der Omi, Short film 
 1998: Goodbye Matze, Short film
 2003: Culture Clan, documentary
 2005: Lost Children, documentary (together with Oliver Stoltz)
 2009: Salami Aleikum, Comedy, Social, Romance. mixture with animation
 2010: Iran: Elections 2009, TV-documentary
 2011: The Green Wave (2010 film), documentary
 2013: 45 Minutes to Ramallah
 2013: Pettersson und Findus - Kleiner Quälgeist, große Freundschaft  (filming)
 2021: Moonbound

References

External links 

 
 ali-samadi-ahadi.de,  Ali Samadi Ahadi's official website

Iranian expatriates in Germany
People from Tabriz
German people of Azerbaijani descent
Iranian film directors
Film people from Cologne
1972 births
Living people
German documentary filmmakers